Bruno Ilien (born 7 May 1959) is a French former racing driver who competed in the 24 Hours of Le Mans in 1984, 1993, and 1996.

References

1959 births
Living people
French racing drivers
24 Hours of Le Mans drivers
Place of birth missing (living people)
20th-century French people